Colin Arthur Roderick  (27 July 1911 – 16 June 2000) was an Australian writer, editor, academic and educator.

Early life and education
Colin Roderick was born in Mount Morgan, Queensland on 27 July 1911.

He attended Bundaberg State School and then, while working as a school teacher, studied through the external studies programme at the University of Queensland, graduating in 1936 with a B.A. He later graduated from the same university with a B.Ed., an M.A., an M.Ed., and finally, in 1954, with a Ph.D. for which he wrote a thesis on Australian novelist Rosa Praed. For part of this period he belonged to the Australian Army.

Career
Roderick worked as editor for the Australian publisher and bookseller Angus & Robertson from 1945 through 1965 and was the firm's director in 1961–65.

During the 1950s he played an "instrumental" role in the setting up of a chair of Australian literature at the University of Sydney. He also helped establish the Miles Franklin Literary Award.

In 1965 he was appointed the inaugural professor of English at the James Cook University, in Townsville, Queensland. During this period he set up the Foundation for Australian Literary Studies (FALS). The Colin Roderick Award, founded in 1967, is named for him.

Final years
After retiring, Roderick  was made emeritus professor in English at James Cook University and subsequently received an honorary Litt.D. from that university and from the Université de Caen.

Honours and awards
 1966: CBE
 1974: Gold Medal of the Australian Literature Society

Select bibliography

As author
 The Lady and the Lawyer, Sydney: Angus & Robertson, 1956.
 John Knatchbull from Quarterdeck to Gallows, Sydney: Angus & Robertson, 1963.
 Miles Franklin: Her Brilliant Career, Adelaide: Rigby, 1982.
 Leichhardt: The Dauntless Explorer, North Ryde: Angus & Robertson, 1988.
 Henry Lawson: A Life, North Ryde, N.S.W.: Angus & Robertson, 1991.
 Banjo Paterson: Poet by Accident, St. Leonards, N.S.W.: Allen & Unwin, 1993.

As editor
  The Australian Novel: A Historical Anthology, Sydney, William Brooks, 1945
 20 Australian Novelists, Sydney: Angus & Robertson, 1947.
 Australian Round-Up : Stories From 1790 to 1950, Sydney: Angus and Robertson, 1953.
Rose Paterson’s Illalong Letters (1873-1888), East Roseville: Kangaroo Press (Simon & Schuster, Australia), 2000.

Henry Lawson Memorial Edition
 Henry Lawson: Collected Verse, Vol. I: 1885-1900, Sydney: Angus & Robertson, 1967.
 Henry Lawson: Collected Verse, Vol. II: 1901-1909, Sydney: Angus & Robertson, 1969.
 Henry Lawson: Collected Verse, Vol. III: 1910-1922, Sydney: Angus & Robertson, 1967.
 Henry Lawson: Letters, 1890-1922, Sydney, Angus & Robertson, 1970
 Henry Lawson: Collected Prose: Vol. I: Short Stories and Sketches, 1888-1922, Sydney, Angus & Robertson, 1972.
 Henry Lawson: Collected Prose: Vol. II: Autobiographical and Other Writings, 1887-1922, Sydney, Angus & Robertson, 1972. 
 Henry Lawson: Collected Prose: Vol. III: Commentary, Sydney, Angus & Robertson, 1972
 Henry Lawson and His World: A Pictorial Biography (in preparation)

Personal life
Roderick died in Townsville, Queensland on 16 June 2000.

References

External links
 Papers of Colin Roderick (manuscripts)

1911 births
2000 deaths
20th-century Australian educators
Australian literary critics
Academic staff of James Cook University
University of Queensland alumni
20th-century Australian male writers
Australian schoolteachers
Australian editors
Australian publishers (people)
Australian Commanders of the Order of the British Empire
Writers from Queensland
20th-century publishers (people)
People from Central Queensland